Palagummi is a village in Amalapuram Mandal, Dr. B.R. Ambedkar Konaseema district in the state of Andhra Pradesh in India.

Geography 

Demographics 
 India census, Palagummi had a population of 2369, out of which 1166 were male and 1203 were female. The population of children below 6 years of age was 8%. The literacy rate of the village was 82%.

References 

Villages in Amalapuram Mandal